The Synagogue Shomré Hadas, commonly known as the . is a Modern Orthodox synagogue built in Antwerp, Belgium. The building is so named because it was commissioned by descendants of Jews who came to Antwerp from the Netherlands in the early 19th century. It was the first large synagogue in Antwerp. Today the synagogue is used for services only on Rosh Hashana, Yom Kippur and Shabbat morning service.

Architecture
Built by Jewish architect Joseph Hertogs (1861–1930) in Moorish revival style, it was inaugurated on Bouwmeestersstraat 7, in 1893.
The synagogue was severely damaged by bombings during World War II and in 1944, the building was hit by a Nazi V1 flying bomb. . It was entirely renovated in 1958. The building is a protected monument since 17 September 1976. Although commissioned by an Orthodox Jewish community, the synagogue has a pipe organ built in the balcony, like for example in the Dohány Street Synagogue in Budapest, Hungary.

See also
History of the Jews in Antwerp

Notes

References

External links

 Synagogue 360: 360° view of the interior of the Hollandse Synagogue

Dutch diaspora in Europe
Dutch-Jewish diaspora
Synagogues in Belgium
Religious buildings and structures in Antwerp
Judaism in Antwerp
Synagogues completed in 1893
Moorish Revival synagogues
Modern Orthodox Judaism in Europe
Modern Orthodox synagogues
Orthodox Judaism in Belgium
Sephardi Jewish culture in Belgium
Sephardi synagogues